The Hornberg is a hill in the northern Breisgau in Baden-Württemberg, Germany. It is an outlier of the Black Forest, running as a north-south ridge between the villages of Windenreute, Kollmarsreute and Sexau into the Upper Rhine Plain. At its northern end is the Hochburg, one of the largest fortresses in South Baden. At its highest point the Hornberg almost reaches a height of 357 metres.

References 

Mountains and hills of Baden-Württemberg
Mountains and hills of the Black Forest
Breisgau-Hochschwarzwald
Baden